Molde FK is a Norwegian professional football club based in Molde, Møre og Romsdal. The club was founded as International in 1911. The club changed its name to Molde in 1915. Molde FK currently play in the Eliteserien, the top tier of Norwegian football. They have not been out of the top tier since 2007. They have been involved in European football several times since their first time in 1975. In 1999 Molde became the second Norwegian club to enter the UEFA Champions League.

This list encompasses the major honours won by Molde FK and records set by the club, their managers and their players. The player records section includes details of the club's leading goalscorers and those who have made most appearances in first-team competitions. It also records club's attendance records, both at Molde Idrettspark, their home until 1997 season, and Aker Stadion, their home from 1998 and forward.

The club's record appearance maker is Daniel Berg Hestad, who made 666 competitive appearances between 1993 and 2016, and the club's record goalscorer is Jan Fuglset, who scored 164 goals between 1963 and 1982.

Honours 
Molde FK's first major trophy was the 1994 Norwegian Football Cup where Lyn were beaten 3–2 in the final. Their most recent trophy came in November 2022, when they won Eliteserien for the fifth time.

Domestic

League 
Norwegian Top Flight: 5
Tippeligaen/Eliteserien (Level 1): 5
2011, 2012, 2014, 2019, 2022
2. divisjon/1. divisjon (Level 2): 3
2. divisjon (Level 2): 2
1973, 1983
1. divisjon (Level 2): 1 
2007

Cup 
 Norwegian Football Cup: 5
1994, 2005, 2013, 2014, 2021

European performances 
 UEFA Champions League Group Stage: 1
1999–2000
 UEFA Europa League Group Stage: 3
2012–13 (GS), 2015–16 (round of 32), 2020–21 (round of 16)
 UEFA Europa Conference League Group Stage: 1
2022–23 (GS)

Players 

All current players are bolded.

Appearances 
 Youngest first-team player: Sander Svendsen –  (against Aalesund, Tippeligaen, 8 May 2013)
 Oldest first-team player: Daniel Berg Hestad –  (against Sevilla, Europa League, 25 February 2016)
 Most consecutive League appearances: 139 – Morten Bakke, 12,510 minutes between 9 May 1996 – 8 July 2001

Most overall appearances 
As of match played 13 November 2022. Competitive matches only.

Most appearances in the top flight  
The following is a list of the ten Molde players with the most appearances in the top division.

Last updated: 13 November 2022

Most appearances in European Competitions 
Appearances in UEFA Champions League, UEFA Europa League, UEFA Cup, UEFA Europa Conference League and UEFA Cup Winners' Cup are counted. Qualification games are included.

Last updated: 3 November 2022

Goalscorers 
 Most goals scored in all competitions: 174 – Jan Fuglset
 Most goals in a season in all competitions: 39 – Andreas Lund, 1999
 Most League goals in a season: 27 
Ohi Omoijuanfo, Eliteserien (level 1), 2021
 Top League scorer with fewest goals in a season: 4
 Magne Hoseth, 2004
 Bernt Hulsker, 2004
 Thomas Mork, 2004
 Most goals scored in a match: 6 – Jan Fuglset v Strømsgodset, 17 October 1976

Most goals scored
The following is a list of the twelve Molde players who have scored the most top division goals.

Last updated: 13 November 2022

Award winners
Kniksen Award (1990–2013)/"Golden Ball" (2014–)
Goalkeeper of the Year:
Morten Bakke, 1995
Espen Bugge Pettersen, 2011
Ørjand Håskjold Nyland, 2014, 2015
Defender of the Year:
Knut Olav Rindarøy, 2009
Vegard Forren, 2012
Martin Linnes, 2014
Midfielder of the Year:
Øyvind Leonhardsen, 1991
Makhtar Thioune, 2009
Magnus Wolff Eikrem, 2011, 2012
Manager/Coach of the Year:
Ole Gunnar Solskjær, 2011, 2012
Tor Ole Skullerud, 2014
Erling Moe, 2022
Breakthrough of the Year:
Erling Haaland, 2018
Young Player of the Year:
Sivert Mannsverk, 2022

Internationals
 First international: Arne Legernes for Norway against Poland, 30 May 1956
 The first non-Norwegian to be capped: Jákup Mikkelsen for Faroe Islands against Yugoslavia, 15 August 2001
 Most international caps (total): 88 - Eiður Guðjohnsen - Iceland (4 while with the club)
 Most international caps as a Molde player: 35 - Åge Hareide - Norway

Transfers

Highest transfer fees received 

The club's record sale came in August 2018, when Erling Haaland was sold to Red Bull Salzburg for €5,0 million. The previous record was set in July 2009, when Molde sold Mame Biram Diouf to Manchester United for €4,5 million.

Team records

Divisional movements

Matches
 First competitive match: Kristiansund 2–2 International, 5 August 1912
 First Norwegian Football Cup match: Rollon 2–1 Molde, qualifying round 1921
 First League match: 
 First match at Molde Stadion: Molde 1–0 Aalesund, 28 August 1955 
 First match at Aker Stadion: Molde 4–0 Lillestrøm, 18 April 1998
 First European match: Molde 1–0 Östers IF, UEFA Cup 1st Round, first leg, 17 September 1975

Record wins
Record win: 
12–1 v Rollon, Møreligaen (level 2), 26 May 1957  
12–1 v Mandalskameratene, 1. divisjon (level 2), 26 August 2007  
11–0 v Langevåg, Norwegian Football Cup 2nd round, 24 June 1987 
11–0 v Bergsøy, Norwegian Football Cup 2nd round, 21 June 1989 
11–0 v Eidsvåg, Norwegian Football Cup 1st round, 1 May 2011  
Record League win: 
12–1 v Rollon, Møreligaen (level 2), 26 May 1957 
12–1 v Mandalskameratene, 1. divisjon (level 2), 26 August 2007 
Record Eliteserien win: 8–0 v Moss, Tippeligaen, 21 April 1996 
Record Norwegian Football Cup win:
11–0 v Langevåg, 2nd round, 24 June 1987 
11–0 v Bergsøy, 2nd round, 21 June 1989 
11–0 v Eidsvåg, 1st round, 1 May 2011 
Record European win: 7–1 v KR, Europa League first qualifying round, first leg, 11 July 2019
Record Champions League win: 3–2 v Olympiacos, Champions League Group Stage, second leg, 20 October 1999
Record home win: 
12–1 v Rollon, Møreligaen (level 2), 26 May 1957 
12–1 v Mandalskameratene, 1. divisjon (level 2), 26 August 2007 
11–0 v Langevåg, 2nd round, 24 June 1987 
11–0 v Bergsøy, 2nd round, 21 June 1989 
Record away win: 11–0 v Eidsvåg, 1st round, 1 May 2011

Record defeats
Record defeat: 0–8 v Stabæk, Tippeligaen, 29 October 2006
Record League defeat: 0–8 v Stabæk, Tippeligaen, 29 October 2006
Record Eliteserien defeat: 0–8 v Stabæk, Tippeligaen, 29 October 2006
Record Norwegian Football Cup defeat: 
0–7 v Rollon,  1st round, 1930
1–8 v Kristiansund,  1st round, 1931
Record European defeat: 0–6 v Öster, UEFA Cup 1st Round, 1 October 1975
Record Champions League defeat: 1–4 v Real Madrid, Group stage, second leg, 21 September 1999 
Record home defeat: 
0–7 v Strømsgodset, Tippeligaen, 9 June 1991
0–7 v Tromsø, Tippeligaen, 2 September 1995
Record away defeat: 0–8 v Stabæk, Tippeligaen, 29 October 2006

Streaks
Only top-tier seasons
 Longest unbeaten run (all major competitions): 26 matches, 13 April 1998 to 22 August 1998
 Longest unbeaten run (League): 24 matches, from 13 April 2014 to 18 October 2014
 Longest unbeaten run from start of the season (League): 21 matches, from the start of the 1998 season to 20 September 1998
 Longest winning streak (League): 17 matches, 
from 10 July 2022 to 13 November 2022
 Longest losing streak (League): 5 matches, 
from 11 August 1996 to 8 September 1996
from 31 July 2005 to 10 September 2005
 Longest drawing streak (League): 5 matches, from 21 September 1975 to 19 October 1975
 Longest streak without a win (League):  10 matches, 
from 1 October 2006 to 27 April 2008
from 24 May 2010 to 29 August 2010
 Longest scoring run (League):  40 matches,
From 23 June 2018 to 29 September 2019
 Longest non-scoring run (League): 5 matches, from 20 October 1996 to 8 May 1997
 Longest streak without conceding a goal (League): 4 matches,
from 4 May 2002 to 9 June 2002
from 18 September 2022 to 16 October 2022

Wins/draws/losses in a season
Only top-tier seasons.
 Most wins in a league season: 25 – 2022
 Most draws in a league season: 10 – 2004, 2010
 Most defeats in a league season: 15 – 1978, 2006
 Fewest wins in a league season: 1 – 1957–58
 Fewest wins in a league season (30 games): 10 – 2010
 Fewest draws in a league season: 2 – 1978, 1999
 Fewest draws in a league season (30 games): 3 – 2022
 Fewest defeats in a league season: 2 – 2022
Highest league win margin: 18 points in 2022, ahead of Bodø/Glimt
Smallest league win margin: 4 points in 2012, ahead of Strømsgodset

Goals
Only top-tier seasons.
 Most League goals scored in a season:
In a 30 game season: 77 – 2020
In a 26 game season: 70 – 1998
In a 22 game season: 40 – 1974, 1988, 1989
In a 14 game season: 18 – 1957–58 
 Fewest League goals scored:
In a 30 game season: 42 – 2010
In a 26 game season: 29 – 2006
In a 22 game season: 23 – 1993
In a 14 game season: 18 – 1957–58
 Most League goals conceded in a season:
In a 30 game season: 45 – 2010
In a 26 game season: 50 – 2006
In a 22 game season: 41 – 1982, 1984
In a 14 game season: 38 – 1957–58
 Fewest League goals conceded:
In a 30 game season: 24 – 2014
In a 26 game season: 26 – 2002
In a 22 game season: 18 – 1974
In a 14 game season: 38 – 1957–58

Points
Only top-tier seasons.
 Most points in a season:
Two points for a win: 
30 in 22 matches, 1. divisjon, 1974
7 in 14 matches, Hovedserien, 1957–58
Three points for a win:
78 in 30 matches, Eliteserien, 2022
54 in 26 matches, Tippeligaen, 1998
40 in 22 matches, 1. divisjon, 1990
 Fewest points in a season:
Two points for a win:
12 in 22 matches, 1. divisjon, 1978
7 in 14 matches, Hovedserien, 1957–58
Three points for a win: 
40 in 30 matches, Tippeligaen, 2010
25 in 26 matches, Tippeligaen, 2006
22 in 22 matches, Tippeligaen, 1993

Attendances
 Highest home attendance: 14,793 v Moss, 10 October 1987 
 Highest home attendance at Aker Stadion: 13,308 v Rosenborg, 26 September 1998
 Highest away attendance: 43,651 v Steaua București 25 October 2012

Season-by-season performance

Record by opponent

Key
The records include the results of matches played in divisions of Norwegian football (from 1937 to present). Wartime matches are regarded as unofficial and are excluded, as are matches from the abandoned 1939–40 season. Test Matches are not included.
  Teams with this background and symbol in the "Club" column are competing in the 2023 Eliteserien alongside Molde.
  Clubs with this background and symbol in the "Club" column are defunct.
P = matches played; W = matches won; D = matches drawn; L = matches lost; F = Goals scored; A = Goals conceded; Win% = percentage of total matches won

League record
1963–2022:

Notes

References

External links
Moldefk.no

records and statistics
Molde FK